Band-e Kuh (also Romanized as Band-e Kūh; also known as Bandi-ye Kūh) is a village in Fareghan Rural District, Fareghan District, Hajjiabad County, Hormozgan Province, Iran. At the 2006 census, its population was 26, in 9 families.

References 

Populated places in Hajjiabad County